Walter Altherr (born 11 July 1946) is a German politician of the Christian Democratic Union (CDU) and former member of the German Bundestag.

Life 
Altherr joined the Junge Union in 1961 and the CDU in 1965. In 1986 he became a member of the district executive of Kaiserslautern-Land. 1978 he took over the office of the local mayor of the municipality Mittelbrunn. In 1989 he moved into the district council of Kaiserslautern. In the 1990 Bundestag elections he was elected to the German Bundestag via the Rhineland-Palatinate state list, of which he was a member until 1994. Altherr was a member of the Rhineland-Palatinate state parliament from 1996 to 2006.

Literature

References

1946 births
Members of the Bundestag for Rhineland-Palatinate
Members of the Bundestag 1990–1994
20th-century German politicians
Members of the Bundestag for the Christian Democratic Union of Germany
Members of the Landtag of Rhineland-Palatinate
Living people